Manuchehr Shahrokhi is a professor of Global Business-Finance at California State University, Fresno, founding editor of the Global Finance Journal and Executive Director of the Global Finance Association/Conference. He has authored over 80 published journal articles, proceedings, books, and manuals on finance topics. He was a visiting professor at Harvard University from 1993 to 1999. His hobbies include: Family, Soccer, Travel, Reading, Writing, and Professional/Community Services.

Selected works
Reverse Licensing: International Technology Transfer to the United States

External links
Global Finance Association
Global Finance Journal
CSU Fresno Faculty Official page at CSU Fresno

Year of birth missing (living people)
Living people
Iranian expatriate academics
Iranian economists
Harvard University faculty
California State University, Fresno faculty
American writers of Iranian descent
American male writers